Biyanda (Ɓìyàndà) and Buli (Ɓùlì) constitute a Gbaya language of the Central African Republic. Ethnologue groups them as Southwest Gbaya, but it is not clear how many of the Southwest varieties are part of the same language; Toongo and Mbodomo, for example, are not closely related, though Toongo speakers identify ethnically as Buli, and Ethnologue also lists Mbodomo as a separate language.

References

Gbaya languages
Languages of the Central African Republic